Putka (Jauja Quechua for "muddy", also spelled Putca) is a mountain in the Paryaqaqa mountain range in the Andes of Peru, about  high. It is located in the Junín Region, Yauli Province, in the districts of Suitucancha and Yauli, north of Qarwachuku.

The largest lake south of Putka is named Putkaqucha (Quechua for "muddy lake", also spelled Putcacocha). One of the small lakes southeast of Putka is named Putkaqucha, too.

References

Mountains of Peru
Mountains of Junín Region